Perkinsela is a genus of kinetoplastids. Species are obligate intracellular components of Neoparamoeba and their relationship is considered mutualistic.

References

Euglenozoa genera
Kinetoplastids